Boletus botryoides is a species of porcini-like fungus native to Hunan Sichuan and Yunnan Provinces in Central China, where it grows under trees of the family Fagaceae.

References

botryoides
Fungi of China
Fungi described in 2016